Gustavo Lobo Paradeda (born 5 October 1979), simply known as Gustavo, is a Brazilian born Russian futsal player who plays for MFK Dinamo Moskva and the Russian national futsal team.

References

External links 
 FIFA profile
 UEFA profile
 AMFR profile

1979 births
Living people
Futsal goalkeepers
Brazilian men's futsal players
Russian men's futsal players
Russian people of Brazilian descent
Naturalised citizens of Russia
Brazilian emigrants to Russia
MFK Dinamo Moskva players